The World Confederation of Organisations of the Teaching Profession (WCOTP) was a global union federation bringing together trade unions representing teachers.

History
The federation was established in 1952, with the merger of the International Federation of Secondary Teachers (FIPESO), the International Federation of Teachers' Associations (IFTA), and the World Organisation of the Teaching Profession (WOTP), the three main international federations of teachers.  FIPESO and the IFTA became sections of the new organisation, while the WOTP was dissolved into it.

The federation aimed to promote the consolidation of teachers' unions, to have one in each country, to support its members, and to exchange professional knowledge.  For many years, it had around 140 members, plus sixty associate members and five specialist international members.  These international members were the International Association for School Librarianship, the International Council on Education for Teaching, the International Council on Health, Physical Education and Recreation, and the International Reading Association.

At the end of 1992, the federation merged with the International Federation of Free Teachers' Unions, to form Education International.

Affiliates
In 1979, the following unions were affiliated to the federation:

Leadership

General Secretaries
1952: William George Carr
1970: John M. Thompson
1980: Norman Goble
1989: Robert Harris

Presidents
1952: Ronald Gould
1970: William George Carr
1975: Wilhelm Ebert
1978: Motofumi Makieda
1981: Jim Killeen
1986: Joseph Itotoh

References

Global union federations
Education trade unions
Trade unions established in 1952
Trade unions disestablished in 1992